Inside No. 9 is a British black comedy anthology television programme that first aired in 2014. It is written by Reece Shearsmith and Steve Pemberton and produced by the BBC. Each 30-minute episode is a self-contained story with new characters and a new setting, and all star Pemberton or Shearsmith (usually both). Aside from the writers, each episode has a new cast, allowing Inside No. 9 to attract a number of well-known actors. The stories are linked only by the number 9 in some way, typically taking the form of a door marked with the number 9, and a brass hare statue that is in the background of all episodes. Themes and tone vary from episode to episode, but all have elements of comedy and horror or perverse humour, in addition to a plot twist. Pemberton and Shearsmith took inspiration for Inside No. 9 from an episode of Psychoville, a previous project, which was filmed in a single room - this in turn was inspired by Alfred Hitchcock's Rope.

The first series was shown in 2014 and featured six regular episodes, alongside a special online-only cinemagraph-based webisode. The second series, again consisting of six episodes, was shown in 2015. Series three began with a Christmas special in December 2016, followed by five more episodes starting February 2017. The fourth series followed in early 2018. There was a one-off Halloween special live episode in October 2018, and the fifth series was shown in 2020. The sixth series aired in 2021, followed by a seventh series in 2022. After the finale, the BBC announced that they had commissioned two further series of the show, bringing it to nine series with series 9 set to be the show's final series. Series 8 premiered on December 22, 2022, with a Christmas special, with the remaining five episodes set to air in 2023.

Inside No. 9 as a whole has been very well received by critics, who have praised the humour and creativity of the scripts, as well as the talent of the featured actors. Commentators have described it as "never less-than-captivating" and "consistently compelling", offering particularly strong praise for "The 12 Days of Christine", "The Riddle of the Sphinx" and "Dead Line". Inside No. 9 won the Sketch and Comedy prize at the 35th annual Banff World Media Festival Rockie Awards, and won the comedy prize at the 2016 Rose d'Or ceremony. It was nominated for the Best TV Sitcom prize at the 2014 Freesat Awards, the Broadcast Award for Best Original Programme, and at the 2014 British Comedy Awards for both the Best New Comedy Programme and the Best Comedy Drama. In the Comedy.co.uk Awards it was voted "Best TV Comedy Drama" in 2014, 2015, 2016, and 2017, and was named "Comedy of the Year" in 2017 and 2018. The series has received three nominations at the British Academy Television Awards. In 2019, Pemberton won Best Male Comedy Performance. In 2021, Shearsmith was nominated for the same award and the show won Best Scripted Comedy.

The scripts of the first three series were released by Hodder & Stoughton in 2020, with scripts of the following three series released in 2022. A book detailing the production history of Series 1 to 5, The Insider's Guide To Inside No. 9 by Mark Salisbury, was released in 2021.

Format
Inside No. 9 is an anthology series, with each episode featuring a new story, with a new setting and new characters. Episodes run roughly thirty minutes each, with the self-contained story reaching a conclusion. The stories are linked primarily by the fact that each has an element of the story linked to the number 9, be that a mansion, a dressing room or even a shoe, size 9. Every episode stars Reece Shearsmith or Steve Pemberton, and regularly both. Each episode is effectively a short play. Some episodes take place in real-time, following half an hour in the lives of the characters. Every episode of Inside No. 9 features an ornamental hare somewhere on-screen. According to Pemberton, "Because each episode is so wildly different there was nothing really linking them other than the fact they were all inside a Number Nine, I just thought it would be nice to have an object that you could hide and just have there on every set." There is, however, no particular significance to the hare itself.

As is typical of Shearsmith and Pemberton's work, the scripts address dark topics, with, for instance, the first episode touching upon incest, child sexual abuse and murder. The plotlines make use of twists and surprises of various sorts, though in some cases the surprise is the lack of twist. In an interview, Pemberton said that "there is always a desire to wrong-foot the viewer. That's what you strive to do". The tone varies episode-by-episode. For example, while gothic horror was a major component in one case, other times slapstick comedy was used extensively; the humour, however, is typically dark and British. The episodes generally begin with scenes of "utter banality", before the darker elements are revealed. Despite the various episodes featuring unrelated plots and characters, one reviewer said that they are all linked "by a mercurial synthesis of morbid comedy, wicked social commentary and a genuine creepiness".

Inside No. 9 is somewhat more grounded and realistic than the writers' previous work, such as Psychoville and The League of Gentlemen. Pemberton said that he and Shearsmith decided not to mix the worlds of Inside No. 9 and their previous projects, but nonetheless include the occasional reference; for example, a character called "Ollie" is mentioned in one Inside No. 9 episode, and the writers imagined that this was Ollie Plimsoles of Legz Akimbo, a character from The League of Gentlemen. Similarly, Inside No. 9 was referenced in the 2017 reunion specials of The League of Gentlemen. Tubbs and Edward are seen living in flat number 9, and the Inside No. 9 hare is visible on their shop counter. In the 2018 Halloween special, in which Pemberton and Shearsmith play versions of themselves, both the League of Gentlemen and its third writer, Mark Gatiss, are directly referred to in the dialogue. The 2020 episode "Death Be Not Proud" directly referenced Psychoville by featuring various characters from the series in that particular episode.

Production and development
In 2012, after finishing their previous show, Psychoville, writers Pemberton and Shearsmith were commissioned to produce two series for the BBC by controllers Janice Hadlow and Cheryl Taylor, partially in response to Sky beginning to produce comedy. At the time, it was unclear whether this would be two series of Inside No. 9, then known by the working title Happy Endings, or a series of Inside No. 9 and a series of some other programme. Inside No. 9 was to be produced by a BBC team, which was later revealed to be David Kerr (director), Jon Plowman (executive producer) and Adam Tandy (producer).

Pemberton and Shearsmith took inspiration for Inside No. 9 from "David and Maureen", episode 4 of the first series of Psychoville, which was in turn inspired by Alfred Hitchcock's Rope. This episode took place entirely in a single room, and was filmed in only two shots. The writers were keen to explore other stories in this bottle episode or TV play format, and Inside No. 9 allowed them to do this. At the same time, the concept of Inside No. 9 was a "reaction" to Psychoville, with Shearsmith saying that the two of them had "been so involved with labyrinthine over-arcing, we thought it would be nice to do six different stories with a complete new house of people each week. That's appealing, because as a viewer you might not like this story, but you've got a different one next week." Elsewhere, Shearsmith explained that the pair returned to writing macabre stories as they "always feel slightly unfulfilled if [they] write something that's purely comedic, [as] it just feels too frivolous and light". The first story that the pair wrote specifically for Inside No. 9 was about a birthday party. BBC producers felt that this story would work as the opening episode of a sitcom, but, given the script's events, Pemberton and Shearsmith were not happy to develop the idea into its own programme. The script was consequently shelved and revisited during the planning process for the second series, becoming "Nana's Party", the fifth episode of the series and eleventh overall. During the filming Inside No. 9, Shearsmith professed excitement to be working on the programme, saying that "[b]eing in the middle of filming a third series of Psychoville would be utterly depressing". Pemberton and Shearsmith aimed for a simpler experience with Inside No. 9 than they had experienced with Psychoville, describing "Sardines", Inside No. 9's first episode, by saying that it was "just about some good actors in a wardrobe with a good story."

At the time of Inside No. 9 production, the anthology series was a rare genre for British television programmes. Previous horror anthologies include Tales of the Unexpected, The Twilight Zone and Alfred Hitchcock Presents; while these would sometimes use comedic elements, they are more prominent in Inside No. 9. Murder Most Horrid followed a similar format, but was far more comedic than horrific. Other anthology-like series on British television include Seven of One and Comedy Playhouse, though these programmes lacked horror elements, and, unlike Inside No. 9, served as pilots for potential series. However, the British anthology show Black Mirror, which also features elements of comedy and horror, was very popular around the time of Inside No. 9. For Pemberton, the 1970s and 1980s were "full of" anthology shows; other examples included Play for Today, Beasts and Armchair Thriller. More recently, anthologies have become less popular with television executives, but the writers hope that they may be able to contribute to a "renaissance" for the genre. According to journalist and broadcaster Mark Lawson, this is because anthologies can fail to motivate viewers to stay with a series, and, further, new sets and casts must be paid for each episode, meaning that a six-part anthology series will generally be more expensive than a six-part series in a more standard format. For Lawson, Inside No. 9 was able to overcome these problems through the "pleasing coherence" offered by the fact each episode was set in a number 9, and "the wit and inventiveness" of the opening episodes, which could sufficiently engage viewers. Pemberton and Shearsmith had originally considered alternative ways to link the stories, such as all the settings having a shared post man, but then decided that such a strong relationship between stories was not needed.

Inspiration and production varied from instalment to instalment, and each was filmed separately, taking less than a week per episode. After Shearsmith and Pemberton had decided that each episode would be about confinement, and having written some of the later episodes, they were inspired by a wardrobe in their working space for "Sardines". The writers were keen to see how confined they could make the characters, aiming to induce feelings of claustrophobia in viewers. The anthology format allowed Pemberton and Shearsmith to revisit prior ideas, which is what they did with "A Quiet Night In" and "Tom & Gerri". The former was inspired by the writers' efforts to include a long segment without dialogue in an episode of Psychoville. Both episodes followed break-ins. The Pinteresque "Tom & Gerri" was based upon a play written by Pemberton and Shearsmith while the pair were living together and job seeking. The setting was based upon their own flat, while the character Tom's development evoked the experience of job-hunting. "Last Gasp" was inspired by a person Pemberton had seen on Multi-Coloured Swap Shop who collected jars of air, as well as the death of Michael Jackson and the death of Amy Winehouse. "The Understudy", the plot of which is partially based upon and concerns Macbeth, took longer to write than any other episode; the writers rewrote the script several times, as they were unsure of whether the characters should be amateur or professional actors. "The Harrowing" was the writers' attempt to produce a gothic horror episode. They made use of more horror tropes than previous episodes, but the setting allowed them to include modern elements.

The BBC ordered a second series of Inside No. 9 before the first episode had aired. The second series was written in 2014, and then filmed from the end of 2014 into early 2015. The writers were permitted two sets for the second series, and so a fake train compartment and a fake flat (for "La Couchette" and "The 12 Days of Christine" respectively) were built at Twickenham Studios. The other episodes were filmed on location; for example, "The Trial of Elizabeth Gadge" was filmed in a barn at the Chiltern Open Air Museum. David Kerr was unable to stay on as director for the second series. Guillem Morales and Dan Zeff each took on directorial duties for two episodes, and Pemberton and Shearsmith, in addition to continuing to write and star in the episodes, jointly directed the other two. The writers had hoped to direct for some time, and this represented a good opportunity to make their directorial debut. While writing for the series, the pair did not know which episodes they would be directing; in an interview, Shearsmith said that the pair had considered directing episodes in which they did not appear much, but scheduling concerns left them with "Cold Comfort" and "Nana's Party"; the episodes feature the writers quite heavily.

The six episodes of the second series derived inspiration from a variety of sources. "La Couchette" aimed to explore the intimacy of sleeper carriages; specifically, the unusual problems associated with sleeping in close proximity to strangers. "The 12 Days of Christine" follows a woman over the course of 12 years, with scenes displaying key moments in her life. "The Trial of Elizabeth Gadge" was inspired by genuine witch trials, some transcripts of which Pemberton and Shearsmith had read as part of the writing process. "Cold Comfort" began with the idea of a call centre, and was filmed in the style of a CCTV feed. With "Nana's Party", the writers aimed for a feeling of suburban darkness, reminiscent of the work of Alan Ayckbourn. "Séance Time" began with the idea of a séance, an idea the writers had wanted to explore for some time.

A third series began broadcasting in February 2017, with a Christmas special, "The Devil of Christmas", airing on 27 December 2016. Settings for the third series include an art gallery, a restaurant and an alpine cabin, while guest stars include Keeley Hawes, Jessica Raine, Felicity Kendal, Tamzin Outhwaite, Fiona Shaw, Jason Watkins, Mathew Baynton, Rula Lenska, Philip Glenister, Sarah Hadland, Javone Prince, Montserrat Lombard, Morgana Robinson, and Alexandra Roach. A fourth series was confirmed after the airing of "The Devil of Christmas", and began broadcast in 2018. Pemberton has said that he would be interested in an online spin-off, perhaps called No. 9A, with less experienced comedy writers. In an interview, he said "The format has so many opportunities and can incorporate so many styles, as long as you stick to the small cast, single location constraint. I think it's really important to bring through fresh voices."
The show's fifth series was commissioned in February 2018, and aired in 2020.

A 2018 live special received particular praise for its unusual and creative format. The episode, described as "astonishingly bold and ambitious" by reviewer Sean O'Grady, appeared to suffer technical difficulties within its first 9 minutes of broadcast. The difficulties, including the continuity announcer's voiceover, were in-fact part of the programme's plot, which centred on the premise that the studios in which the episode were being filmed were haunted. Around 20% of the audience reportedly switched off before the deception became apparent. The plot included a number of  features playing with the live format, including Shearsmith and Pemberton watching the live broadcast, and Shearsmith sending a Tweet during the show.

In December 2022, it was revealed that Inside No. 9 would pause after the ninth series airs. Pemberton said: "We feel it is a good time to pause Inside No. 9 after we finish filming season 9 next year [...] We're not saying it's over for good [...] but we won't be looking to make any more episodes for the time being."

Episodes

Series overview

Series 1 (2014)

Webisode (2014)

Series 2 (2015)

Series 3 (2016–17)

Series 4 (2018)

Halloween special (2018)
This episode was a live broadcast, rather than a pre-recorded episode. The music, by Christian Henson, was also performed live.

Series 5 (2020)

Series 6 (2021)

Series 7 (2022)

Series 8 (2022–23)

Cast
As each episode of Inside No. 9 features new characters, the writers were able to attract actors who may have been unwilling or unable to commit to an entire series. The writers' reputation also helped attract actors, with journalist David Chater saying that they "have developed such a track record over the years that many of the finest actors in the country jump at the chance to appear in their dark imaginings". The fact that Pemberton and Shearsmith only played a single character in each story was a change for them; in The League of Gentlemen, the pair have played some 30 characters each, while, in Psychoville, they had played around five each. Though Pemberton and Shearsmith generally starred in each episode, they did not necessarily take on the main roles. Shearsmith explained this by saying that they "didn't write this for us to be in. We wrote the stories first then thought, could we be in them?" Pemberton appears in all episodes other than "The Harrowing", while Shearsmith appears in all episodes other than "Last Gasp".

Distribution
The first series of Inside No. 9 was shown in the UK on BBC Two (and BBC Two HD) between 5 February and 12 March 2014. It was aired in Australia on BBC First, premiering on 5 January 2015. The second series aired in the UK from 26 March to 29 April 2015, and aired in Australia from 27 July 2015.

The first series was released on DVD on 17 March 2014. In addition to the six episodes, the DVD featured the making of feature "Inside Inside No. 9", including unseen interviews with Pemberton, Shearsmith and Kerr, and a photo gallery with previously unreleased photos. Published by 2 Entertain, the DVD was rated 18 by the British Board of Film Classification. To publicise the DVD, the writers appeared at the Oxford Street, London, branch of HMV for a signing event on 20 March. The DVD was reviewed by David Upton for webzine PopMatters, who gave the main feature an 8/10 rating, and the extras a 5/10 rating, and Ben Walsh for The Independent, who gave the DVD overall 4/5. Phelim O'Neill, reviewing the release for The Guardian, described the boxset as "very lendable", suggesting that it would help Inside No. 9 reach a wider audience. South African newspapers The Sunday Times and The Star both published positive reviews of the DVD, with The Stars anonymous review saying the DVD "makes a great prezzie for cynics, so if you know any lawyers or journalists...". The second series was released on DVD on 4 May 2015. A review in the Leicester Mercury awarded it four out of five stars. The advent of Series 3 saw Series 1&2 released on Blu-ray on 13 February 2017. Series 3 has a 27 March 2017 release on DVD and Blu-ray. The complete series 4 was released on DVD and Blu-ray on 12 February 2018, while series 5 was released only on DVD 23 March 2020, there is no Blu-ray release as of now for series 5.

Reception and performance

Critical reception
Many critics responded very positively to Inside No. 9. After the final episode of the first series, the comedic critic Bruce Dessau said on his website that it had "really set an early benchmark to beat for comedy of the year. It has been consistently compelling as each week we entered an entirely different world." On the same day, David Chater, writing in The Times, said of the series as a whole that "[i]t's hard to know which to admire more – the rich and perverse imaginations of Steve Pemberton and Reece Shearsmith or the extraordinary range of acting talent that has brought this strange and memorable series to life." Chater had previously described "A Quiet Night In", the second episode of Inside No. 9, as "the funniest, cleverest, most imaginative and original television I have seen for as long as I can remember – one of those fabulous programmes where time stands still and the world around you disappears". Mark Jones (The Guardian) considered the whole series, saying that the Inside No. 9 was "never less-than-captivating", while a review in the Liverpool Echo described every episode as "intriguing and lovingly-crafted", though it was felt that the first three episodes were stronger than the latter three. In December 2014, Metro television critic Keith Watson named Inside No. 9 the twentieth best television programme of 2014, and in January 2015, Daily Star Sunday columnist Garry Bushell named Inside No. 9 the best comedy TV programme of 2014.

Writing before Inside No. 9 was televised, broadcaster and journalist Mark Lawson suggested that, among anthology series, the programme possessed "the potential to be remembered as a singular achievement". Commending both the acting and writing of Inside No. 9, New Statesman television critic Rachel Cooke offered a positive verdict of the programme after seeing the first half of the series. Cooke expressed particular admiration of Pemberton and Shearsmith's ability to squeeze "perfectly formed narratives –  characters with proper backstories, scenarios that are complicated and unwind relatively slowly –  into just 30 minutes". Also writing mid-series, journalist Gareth Lightfoot called Inside No. 9 "hands down the best, freshest thing on [television] at the moment" in the Evening Gazette, though he doubted whether it could truly be considered comedy.

Donal Lynch, of Irish newspaper the Sunday Independent, suggested that, like the previous work of Pemberton and Shearsmith, Inside No. 9 may be something of "a cult hit/acquired taste". Barry Didcock, of The Herald, expressed a similar sentiment, calling Inside No. 9 "probably the most Marmitey programme on television". The Times published a response to a complaint received from a viewer, who was unhappy with Chater's positive reviews of Inside No. 9, suggesting that "A Quiet Night In" was more traumatic than humorous. Sam Wollaston, television critic for The Guardian, noted that humour is extremely personal, and though he could appreciate much about Inside No. 9, he had never liked Pemberton and Shearsmith's work: "I'm sure I'll be crucified – probably quite rightly – but I don't love Inside No 9." Some tabloid columnists also expressed dissatisfaction with the programme. Virginia Blackburn, of the Daily Express, wrote a highly critical review of "Last Gasp". Blackburn considered Inside No. 9 an example of the weakness of contemporary television comedy, saying that the episode is "not funny, it's not clever and is so utterly, irredeemably, naffly silly that it ends up being incredibly irritating and nothing else". Another journalist unimpressed was the Daily Mirror columnist Kevin O'Sullivan, who dismissed the programme by saying simply "BBC2's alleged comedy Inside No. 9: didn't even smile".

Cooke observed the difficulty in reviewing Inside No. 9 as a whole due to the fact that each episode is different from the last. "Sardines" was commended for its cast and acting, as well as the scripting, but critics had a mixed response to the twist ending. "A Quiet Night In" was a change in approach, relying on physical comedy, but it was well received as funny, and inventive. "Tom & Gerri" was less comedic but darker than previous episodes; critics commended the plot, but disagreed about the portrayal of mental illness in the episode. Less horrific than other episodes in the series, "Last Gasp" dealt with themes of celebrity culture and fandom, and was considered a weaker instalment. Critics called "The Understudy" a "return to form". While it was based upon Macbeth, a knowledge of the play was not necessary for enjoyment, and the plot's divergence from the play was praised. "The Harrowing" was the most horrific episode of the series, and was considered genuinely scary by critics.

"La Couchette" was characterised by critics as strong and funny, with praise directed at the cast and script. "The 12 Days of Christine" was hailed as "masterpiece" and "a quiet elegy, terse and polished, in many ways perfect". The emotional script, poignancy of the ending and performance of the cast, especially Smith, was highly praised. "The Trial of Elizabeth Gadge" was compared unfavourably with the previous two episodes by some critics, though the writers were characterised as having displayed their versatility and ability with the atypical setting and language. Critics had a mixed response to the episode's humour, but praised the performance of the cast. "Cold Comfort" was generally praised, though also characterised as weaker than other episodes in the series. The unusual filming style was commended, but there was a mixed response to the episode's ending. "Nana's Party" received high praise for its script and characters, and for the cast's performances. "Séance Time" was praised as well written and genuinely frightening, while Alison Steadman's performance being picked out for commendation by many critics.

In a 2018 article for Salon, American writer Mary Elizabeth Williams described the series as "the best show you're not watching" and "brilliant, black-humored, taut format horror for people who enjoy the occasional potty-joke". In 2019, Inside No. 9 was ranked 66th on The Guardian'''s list of the 100 best TV shows of the 21st century.

Viewing figures

Despite the generally positive reception among critics and viewers, the viewing figures for the first series were poor. The average viewing figures for the series were 904,000 people, or 4.9% of the audience, lower than the slot average of 970,000 (5.1% of the audience). The series had a strong start, with 1.1 million viewers, which was 5.6% of the audience, watching "Sardines". The series low was the fifth episode, "The Understudy", which attracted 720,000 viewers (4.1% of the audience). The highest ratings were achieved by The Bones of St. Nicholas with 2.7 million viewers watching within 28 days of broadcast.

Awards and nominations
People
Thanks to their work on Inside No. 9, Pemberton and Shearsmith jointly won the 2014/2015 Royal Television Society Programme award for best comedy performance. The other nominees were Harry Enfield, for his performance in Harry and Paul's Story of the Twos, and Sarah Hadland, for her performance in The Job Lot. The pair were also jointly nominated for the 2015 British Academy Television Craft Award for comedy writer for their work on Inside No. 9, but lost to Mackenzie Crook for his work on Detectorists. Arthur Matthews and Matt Berry (Toast of London) and Mathew Baynton and James Corden (The Wrong Mans) were the other nominees. The following year, Guillem Morales was nominated for the Television Craft Award for Breakthrough Talent for his work on "The 12 Days of Christine", but lost to Michaela Coel, who wrote Chewing Gum. The other nominees were D. C. Moore (Not Safe for Work) and Marcus Plowright (Muslim Drag Queens).

At the 2013/2014 Royal Television Society Craft and Design Awards, Lisa Cavalli-Green was nominated for the "Make Up Design – Drama" award for her work on Inside No. 9, but lost to Davy Jones, for his work on In the Flesh. Loz Schiavo (Peaky Blinders) was the other nominee. Due in part to her role in "The Harrowing", Aimee-Ffion Edwards was shortlisted for WalesOnline's "Daffta" award for best actress, but lost to Eve Myles. The Dafftas celebrate Welsh television talent and prizes are awarded based on a public vote.

At the 2018 Writers' Guild Awards, administered by the Writers' Guild of Great Britain, Shearsmith and Pemberton won the Best TV Situation Comedy award for their work on "The Bill". The award was presented by Brenda Gilhooly. The other nominees were Daisy May Cooper and Charlie Cooper, the writers of This Country, and Simon Blackwell, for his work on Back.

At the 2019 British Academy Television Awards, Pemberton won for Best Male Comedy Performance, while at the 2019 British Academy Television Craft Awards, Barbara Wiltshare won for Best Director: Multi-Camera.

At the 2021 British Academy Television Awards, Shearsmith was nominated for Best Male Comedy Performance.

ProgrammeInside No. 9 won the award for "Best TV Comedy Drama" at the Comedy.co.uk Awards in 2014, 2015, 2016, 2017, and 2018, beating Cold Feet, Flowers, Fresh Meat, Jonathan Creek and Stag in 2016, Cold Feet, Doc Martin, Eric, Ernie and Me, Murder on the Blackpool Express and No Offence in 2017, and Click & Collect, Dave Allen At Peace, Death on the Tyne, Flowers and No Offence in 2018. In 2017, Inside No. 9 was named the Comedy.co.uk "Comedy of the Year". The show retained the award in 2018.Inside No. 9 won the Sketch and Comedy prize at the 35th annual Banff World Media Festival Rockie Awards. The other nominees were Do I Have to Take Care of Everything?, It's a Date, Tiny Plastic Men, Gangsta Granny and The Revolution Will Be Televised. In response to the nomination, Shearsmith tweeted that he was "[t]hrilled", joking that the programme was "in 'Comedy'. I knew it was one". Inside No. 9 was also nominated for Best TV Sitcom at the 2014 Freesat Awards, which celebrate the best of free British television. The programme lost to BBC2's The Wrong Mans, as determined by a panel made up of television experts and commentators. The other nominees were Birds of a Feather, Mrs. Brown's Boys and Toast of London. In November 2014, it was announced that Inside No. 9 had been shortlisted for the 2015 Broadcast Award for Best Original Programme. The other nominees were Crackanory, Glasgow Girls, Release the Hounds, Suspects and The Island with Bear Grylls. At the award ceremony in London on 4 February 2015, Glasgow Girls was granted the award, but Inside No. 9 was highly commended. Inside No. 9 won the TV award at the 2015 Chortle Awards. The programme was longlisted for the Best Comedy prize in the 2015 TV Choice Awards. The programme won the 2016 comedy Rose d'Or, beating the Finnish Pyjama Party and the German Crime Scene Cleaner (Der Tatortreiniger).

At the 2014 British Comedy Awards, Inside No. 9 was nominated in the Best New Comedy Programme and the Best Comedy Drama categories. In the former category, it lost to Toast of London. The other nominees were The Wrong Mans and Man Down. In the latter category, it lost to Rev, and the other nominees were The Wrong Mans and Uncle. For Chater (The Times), the comedy drama category was the strongest of the awards, but for Ben Williams (Time Out), Inside No. 9 should have won. Writing in The Independent, journalist Alice Jones said she was "sorry to see the relentlessly innovative Inside No 9'' go unrewarded".

At the 2021 British Academy Television Awards, the series won Best Scripted Comedy.

Awards and nominations table

Notes

References

External links
 
 
 
 
 "The Inventors", interactive online-only episode

2014 British television series debuts
2010s British anthology television series
2010s British black comedy television series
2010s British comedy-drama television series
2010s British horror television series
2010s British mystery television series
2020s British anthology television series
2020s British black comedy television series
2020s British comedy-drama television series
2020s British horror television series
2020s British mystery television series
BBC anthology television shows
BBC black comedy television shows
BBC comedy-drama television shows
BBC mystery television shows
British horror comedy television series
English-language television shows
Horror drama television series
Television series by BBC Studios